Bexley is an area of south-east London, England, sometimes known as Bexley Village.

Bexley may also refer to:

Places
 London Borough of Bexley, in Greater London, England
 Bexley (UK Parliament constituency)
 Bexley College, now part of London South East Colleges
 Bexley Grammar School
 Bexleyheath, a town
 Bexley, Ohio, a suburb of Columbus, Ohio, United States of America
 Bexley High School
 Bexley, Mississippi, U.S.
 Bexley, New Zealand, a suburb of Christchurch, New Zealand
 Bexley, New South Wales, a suburb of Sydney, Australia
 Bexley Township, Ontario, Canada
 Cape Bexley, a headland in Nunavut, Canada

Names
Bexley (given name)

See also 
 Bexley Hall (disambiguation)